Fermor-Hesketh is a surname, and may refer to:

 Alexander Fermor-Hesketh, 3rd Baron Hesketh (born 1950), British Conservative politician
 Thomas Fermor-Hesketh, 1st Baron Hesketh (1881–1944), British soldier

See also

 Fermor, surname
 Hesketh (disambiguation)

Compound surnames